Scobie in September is a 1969 thriller television series which originally aired on BBC 1 in 1969. It takes place around the Edinburgh Festival. Bill Craig wrote a spin-off novel of the same title.

Cast
 Maurice Roëves as Scobie
 Hannah Gordon as Judy
 Anton Diffring as Pandorus
 David Langton as Sir James Thorne
 Bryden Murdoch as Munro 
 Garfield Morgan as Slackhand
 John Grieve as Sergeant Turner 
 Gerard Heinz as Pereira
 Anne Kristen as  Lilli
 Anthony Valentine as Vickers
 Hugh Evans as Brodie
 Fulton Mackay as The Watchmaker
 Helena Gloag as Mrs. Geary
 Alex McAvoy as Archie

References

Bibliography
Baskin, Ellen . Serials on British Television, 1950-1994. Scolar Press, 1996.

External links
 

BBC television dramas
1969 British television series debuts
1969 British television series endings
English-language television shows